Pseudodolbina is a genus of moths in the family Sphingidae. The genus was erected by Walter Rothschild in 1894.

Species
Pseudodolbina aequalis Rothschild & Jordan 1903
Pseudodolbina fo (Walker 1856)
Pseudodolbina fo celator Jordan, 1926

References

Sphingini
Moth genera
Taxa named by Walter Rothschild